Ward Milton Williams (June 26, 1923 – December 17, 2005) was an American professional basketball player. Ward was selected in the first round (8th overall) in the 1948 BAA Draft by the Fort Wayne Pistons. He played for the Pistons in 1948–49 and appeared in 53 games.

BAA career statistics

Regular season

External links

1923 births
2005 deaths
Basketball players from Indiana
Fort Wayne Pistons draft picks
Fort Wayne Pistons players
Forwards (basketball)
Indiana Hoosiers men's basketball players
People from Clinton County, Indiana
American men's basketball players